Podvorec is a village in Varaždin County, Croatia.

External links

State Archive Varaždin
Podvorec census records

Populated places in Varaždin County